Nikolay Dmitriyevich Kuznetsov (born 19 February 1999) is a Russian football player. He plays for FC Sokol Saratov.

Club career
He made his debut in the Russian Football National League for FC Rotor Volgograd on 15 March 2020 in a game against FC Shinnik Yaroslavl.

References

External links
 
 Profile by Russian Football National League
 
 

1999 births
Sportspeople from Volgograd
Living people
Russian footballers
Association football midfielders
FC Rotor Volgograd players
FC Sokol Saratov players
Russian First League players
Russian Second League players